The Omuramba Ovambo is an omuramba (dry river bed) in Namibia. It originates about five kilometers from Tsintsabis and flows into Etosha Pan. This river only flows when there is heavy rainfall. The river has almost no organic life in it due to its fluctuating water levels. The river banks are filled with rows of Camelthorn and Acacia trees which provide shade to the surrounding animals and San people who live in the area.

San people

The main towns in which the San live in Namibia are Tsintsabis and Tsumkwe near the sand valley "Boesmanland". Near the river is a large village with a community of San which mostly depend on the river's resources. These people have very little money, and  unfortunately are very secluded from the rest of society so they must buy most things at a very high price due to travel costs. Fortunately once or twice every year during heavy rainfall the bushmen have the chance to gather water (as Tsintsabis is a very dry and hot place) and also catch fish, although preservation can sometimes be an issue. The most abundant fish is the Barbel due to its ability to burrow under muddy ground to keep itself safe from the harsh air and sun when the river is not flowing.

Tourism

The Omuramba Ovambo has become a tourist attraction, where many people go for a relaxing day trip. One can barbecue on the banks of the Omaramba, and due to the lack of crocodiles, it is a safe place to swim.

See also
List of rivers of Namibia

References

Rivers of Namibia